Redhill School is a private English medium co-educational multi-faith day school located in Morningside, Johannesburg, Gauteng, South Africa.  The school's motto is 'Free to Build'.

It was founded in 1907 and has over a thousand pupils from pre-primary (3 years) to high school (grade 12) enrolled. The school is part of ISASA (the Independent Schools Association of Southern Africa) and matriculants write the South African IEB examinations. In 2018, the school also introduced the IB (International Baccalaureate) Diploma Program as an optional parallel program to the IEB.

The school is divided into a Redhill Early Learning Center, Redhill Preparatory School, Redhill Middle School and Redhill High School. All four schools share a campus and facilities.

Architecture
The campus is primarily made up of red-brick buildings with green corrugated iron roofing. The older buildings on the campus are a set of thatched rondavels in a typical African style.

References

External links 
 https://www.redhill.co.za/about/history

Schools in Johannesburg
Private schools in Gauteng
Educational institutions established in 1907
1907 establishments in South Africa